Grand Finale may refer to:

Events
Grand Finale (V8 Supercars), the name given to the final round of the V8 Supercar Championship Series from 2004 to 2008
Grand Finale (Cassini), the final phase of the Cassini orbiter mission to Saturn

Music
"Grand Finale" (song), a 1998 song by DMX, Method Man, Nas, and Ja Rule
"The Grand Finale", a song by Styx from their 1977 album The Grand Illusion
"Grande Finale", a song by Studio Killers

Other uses
Grand Finale (film), a 1936 British comedy film

See also
 Grand final, a game that decides a sports league's premiership (or championship) winning team